Mario Volpe (1894–1968) was an Italian film director.

Selected filmography
 The Cry of the Eagle (1923)
 New Moon (1925)
 The Two Sisters (1950)
 Papà ti ricordo (1952)

References

Bibliography
 Brunetta, Gian Piero. The History of Italian Cinema: A Guide to Italian Film from Its Origins to the Twenty-first Century.  Princeton University Press, 2009.

External links

1894 births
1968 deaths
Italian film directors
19th-century Neapolitan people